Philip Rashleigh may refer to:

 Philip Rashleigh (1689–1736), MP for Liskeard 1710–22
 Philip Rashleigh (1729–1811), MP for Fowey 1765–1802